Angus Cobblestone Farmhouse and Barn Complex is a historic home and barn located at Benton in Yates County, New York. The complex consists of the farmhouse, was constructed about 1831–1834, and three contributing outbuildings.  The farmhouse is an example of vernacular Greek Revival style, cobblestone domestic architecture. The exterior walls are built of variously shaped and colored field cobbles.  Also on the property are two large frame barns and a small shed.  The farmhouse is smong the nine surviving cobblestone buildings in Yates County.

It was listed on the National Register of Historic Places in 1992.

References

Houses on the National Register of Historic Places in New York (state)
Greek Revival houses in New York (state)
Cobblestone architecture
Houses completed in 1834
Houses in Yates County, New York
National Register of Historic Places in Yates County, New York